Black Top Records was an American, New Orleans, Louisiana-based independent record label, founded in 1981 by brothers Nauman S. Scott, III and Hammond Scott. The label specialized in blues and R&B music. The first release was "Talk To You By Hand" by Anson Funderburgh & the Rockets. The artist roster included Earl King, Snooks Eaglin, Lee Rocker, Guitar Shorty, and Robert Ward, among others.

History
The label started out primarily as a blues label, and soon stretched out to New Orleans R&B and American roots music. Black Top especially excelled in discovering obscure talents. Many of the label's artists such as Robert Ward, Carol Fran, Clarence Hollimon, and W. C. Clark were either relatively unknown, or had been away from record contracts and/or the  music industry for many years. The label used a variety of musicians on its recordings, including many from the New Orleans music community. Examples include George Porter Jr., David Torkanowsky, Herman V. Ernest III, and Sammy Berfect; Black Top also often hired the members of the Antone's house band from Austin, Texas, including Mark "Kaz" Kazanoff on saxophone. Pianist and organist Nick Connolly, also based in Austin, was another musician who recorded several sessions. Although Black Top concentrated on recording new material for the most part, it also handled some vintage reissues from artists such as Earl Hooker and Hollywood Fats.

Initially, its catalog was distributed by Rounder Records. When the contract ended in the mid-nineties, Passport Music took over distribution for a brief period of time; Chicago blues label Alligator Records distributed the Black Top catalog after that.

After releasing well over 100 albums, the label closed in 1999. Nauman Scott died in 2002. Hammond Scott sold the rights of the catalog, and some releases were reissued on labels such as Varèse Sarabande, Fuel 2000, and Shout! Factory. In 2006, P-Vine Records in Japan acquired the worldwide rights to them.

Artists

Solomon Burke
Earl King
Anson Funderburgh & The Rockets (featuring Sam Myers)
Mike Morgan and the Crawl
Maria Muldaur
Snooks Eaglin
James Harman Band
Guitar Shorty
Hollywood Fats Band
Rod Piazza & The Mighty Flyers
Nappy Brown
James "Thunderbird" Davis
W. C. Clark
Gary Primich
Omar & the Howlers
Lee Rocker's Big Blue
Lynn August
Joe "Guitar" Hughes
Bill Kirchen
Johnny Dyer
Rick Holmstrom
 The Cold Cuts
Ronnie Earl & The Broadcasters
Bobby Radcliff
Al Copley
Grady Gaines
Ron Levy's Wild Kingdom
Bobby Parker
The Neville Brothers
Earl Gaines
Robert Ealey
Big Joe and the Dynaflows
Carol Fran & Clarence Hollimon
Robert Ward
Tommy Ridgley

See also
 List of record labels

References

Blues record labels
Defunct record labels of the United States
American independent record labels
Record labels based in Louisiana
Record labels established in 1981
Record labels disestablished in 1999
Soul music record labels